Acauã Ecological Station ( is a state-operated ecological station in the State of Minas Gerais, Brazil. It is a strictly protected area and is closed to the public except for research and environmental education.

Location

It was created on 23 September 1974, modified on 27 September 1994 and 30 December 1994. It is in the Jequitinhonha Valley region in Minas Gerais.

Environment

The vegetation is dense cerrado with transition to Atlantic Forest. The flora consists of medium to large plants.
Fauna include armadillo, maned wolf, common agouti, paca, collared peccary (Pecari tajacu), robust capuchin monkey and broad-snouted caiman (Caiman latirostris). More than 190 species of birds have been identified.

In April 2013, the Public Ministry and Justice department of Minas Gerais charged that the State Forestry Institute had been failing to comply with environmental legislation. There were serious problems such as lack of a management plan, physical structures and personnel, and land tenure issues with the ecological stations of  Mata do Acauã and Mata dos Ausentes and the state parks of Biribiri, Alto Cariri, Rio Preto and Serra Negra.

Notes

Sources

1974 establishments in Brazil
Ecological stations of Brazil
Protected areas of Minas Gerais
Protected areas established in 1974